The Alhambra Cinema is a 1937 Art Deco style building on Jerusalem Boulevard in Jaffa, Tel Aviv, Israel, designed by Lebanese architect Elias Al-Mor, and original built as a cinema.  It was named after the Alhambra palace in Spain. 

Throughout its history it has been active as an Arab cultural institution (in Mandatory Palestine), again as a cinema after the establishment of Israel, and as a theatre after 1963. In 2010 it was purchased and renovated by the Church of Scientology, and in 2012 was opened as the Ideal Center of Scientology for the Middle East.

History

The building was opened in May 1937 and was one of the biggest and luxurious cinemas in Palestine. It became a cultural centre and hosted famous Arab artists such as Umm Kulthum, Farid al-Atrash and Leila Mourad. Local residents, both local Arabs and Jews originating from Arab countries, came to the shows together with their families.

The cinema was owned and managed by Palestinian Arabs, among them Isa al-Safri, Muhammad Abduh Hilmi, Muhammad Musa al-Husayni, Muhammad Younis al-Husayni, Muhammad Ramadan Hammu, Hasan Arafeh, Abdul-Rahman Alhaj Ibrahim, and Mughnnam Mughnnam. Photos from 1937, during the Arab revolt in Palestine, show an Arab flag studded with light bulbs fitted as a permanent fixture at the top of the building's turret.

After the 1948 war it became Israeli property and reopened under the name "Yafor". In the late 1970s the building was largely abandoned. Until 2007 a bank used the main entrance, which faces the boulevard, as a branch.

Starting in 2010 the building, affected by decades of transformations, underwent restoration and refurbishment, and in 2012 it was inaugurated as an Israeli and regional centre for Scientology.

See also
Architecture of Palestine
Cinema of Israel

References

External links

Photo gallery of pre- and post-restoration Alhambra. Website of Eyal Ziv, the architect who restored the building in 2010-2012.

Architecture in the State of Palestine
Buildings and structures in Tel Aviv
Cinemas and movie theatres in Israel
1937 establishments in Mandatory Palestine
Former cinemas
Scientology properties